Associazione Calcio Sportiva Dilettantistica Saluzzo (briefly ACSD Saluzzo or AC Saluzzo, commonly Saluzzo) is an Italian association football club located in Saluzzo, Piedmont. It currently plays in Serie D. Its colors are all-maroon.

External links
 Official site
 Saluzzo page @ Serie-D.com (archived)

Association football clubs established in 1937
Football clubs in Piedmont and Aosta Valley
Saluzzo
1937 establishments in Italy